The 2011 Island Games on the Isle of Wight was the 12th edition in which an association football tournament was played at the multi-games competition. It was contested by 15 teams.

There were numerous talking points in the early stages of the competition. The Rhodes team was disqualified after the second game for repeated indiscipline, and were suspended from the next two Island Games. In Group D, there was a unique occurrence as both the Åland Islands and Saaremaa finished with identical playing records after their two games. Rather than draw lots as had been originally planned for such circumstances, the two teams played a one-off penalty shoot-out on the designated rest day to determine which side would finish top of the group, with Åland proceeding to the semi-finals.

The host country, the Isle of Wight, defeated Guernsey after extra-time in the final to win their 2nd title, following a win over reigning champions Jersey in the semi-final.

Participants

 Isle of Man

Group phase

Group A

 Rhodes were disqualified from the competition after two games due to their disciplinary record, which saw five players sent off with nine other players receiving yellow cards in their two games. Menorca were awarded a 3 – 0 victory for the game that would have taken place between the two teams.

Group B

Group C

Group D

 As both Åland Islands and Saaremaa finished with identical playing records, a penalty shoot out was held to decide the winner of Group D

Penalty-shoot out play-off for 1st place

Placement play-off matches

13th place match

11th place match

9th place match

7th place match

5th place match

Final stage

Bracket

Semifinals

Third place match

Final

Final rankings

See also
Women's Football at the 2011 Island Games

References

External links
Official 2011 website

Men
2011